Bud Hendrickson was an American football coach.  He served as the head football coach at Carthage College in Carthage, Illinois for one season, in 1905, compiling a record of 4–2.

Head coaching record

References

Year of birth missing
Year of death missing
Carthage Firebirds football coaches